L'Écluse is a village of Wallonia and a district of the municipality of Beauvechain, located in the province of Walloon Brabant, Belgium.

It was a municipality in its own right before the fusion of the Belgian municipalities in 1977.

References 

Former municipalities of Walloon Brabant
Beauvechain